Tror du jeg er født i går! is a 1941 Danish family film directed by Lau Lauritzen Jr. and Alice O'Fredericks.

Cast
Max Hansen as Cornelius Nielsen
Maria Garland as Tante Emma Solberg
Bodil Steen as Frk. Johanne Solberg
Tove Arni as Paula
Knud Heglund as Fætter Henrik Hahe
Eigil Reimers as Direktør Hans Hahe
Victor Montell as Overretssagfører Brix Jensen
Berthe Qvistgaard as Sekretær Frk. Poulsen
Mathilde Nielsen as Frk. Møller
Petrine Sonne as Frk. Møller
Karl Goos
Erika Voigt
Karl Jørgensen
Thorkil Lauritzen
Alex Suhr
Bruno Tyron
Helga Frier

References

External links

1941 films
1941 drama films
Danish drama films
1940s Danish-language films
Danish black-and-white films
Films directed by Lau Lauritzen Jr.
Films directed by Alice O'Fredericks